Ahmed Ali Mirza (9 February 1907 – 18 November 1968) was an Indian politician who served as a member of Rajya Sabha (the Upper house of the Parliament of India) from 1958 to 1964. He was also the member of Delhi Corporation in 1958.

References 

1907 births
1968 deaths
Rajya Sabha members from Delhi